The 1928 Sam Houston State Bearkats football team represented Sam Houston State Teachers College (now known as Sam Houston State University) as a member of the Texas Intercollegiate Athletic Association (TIAA) during the 1928 college football season. Led by sixth-year head coach J. W. Jones, the Bearkats compiled an overall record of 5–5 with a mark of 3–2 in conference play, placing fourth in the TIAA.

Schedule

References

Sam Houston State
Sam Houston Bearkats football seasons
Sam Houston State Bearkats football